The following is a list of reality television show franchises that have become franchises with production of local versions around the world, from H through Z.

Idols

Notes

Iron Chef

Just the Two of Us

Love & Hip Hop

Love Island

Popstars

Project Runway

Reality Circus

Drag Race

Single Moms

Star Academy

Star Search

The Surreal Life

Survivor

Top Model

The Voice

Notes

The X Factor

References

Lists of television series by genre

Lists of media franchises